Gas separation can refer to any of a number of techniques used to separate gases, either to give multiple products or to purify a single product.

Swing adsorption techniques

Pressure swing adsorption

Pressure swing adsorption (PSA) pressurizes and depressurizes gas around an adsorbent media to selectively adsorb certain components of a gas, allowing others to be selectively discarded.

Vacuum swing adsorption

Vacuum swing adsorption (VSA) uses the same principle as PSA but swings between vacuum pressures and atmospheric pressure. The two techniques may be combined and are called "vacuum pressure swing adsorption" (VPSA) in this case.

Temperature swing adsorption

Temperature swing adsorption (TSA) uses a similar technique to other swing adsorption techniques but cycles temperature instead of pressure.

Cryogenic distillation

Cryogenic distillation is typically only used for very high volumes because of its nonlinear cost-scale relationship, which makes the process more economical at larger scales. Because of this it is typically only used for air separation.

See also 
 
 
 
 
 
 

 
Analytical chemistry
Industrial gases
Gas technologies